Nanni is an Italian surname and a masculine Italian given name (as a shortened form of Giovanni). Notable people with the name include:

Surname
 Federico Nanni (born 1981), Sammarinese footballer
 Girolamo Nanni, 17th-century Italian painter of the Baroque period
 Giulia Nanni (born 1997), Italian professional racing cyclist
 Mauricio Nanni (born 1979), Uruguayan footballer
 Roberto Nanni (born 1981), Argentine footballer
 Tito Nanni (born 1959), American former professional baseball player
 Fred Nanni (born 1925), American former professional football player

Given name
 Nanni (born before 1750 BC), author of the first known complaint letter (Complaint tablet to Ea-nasir)
 Nanni Baldini (born 1975), Italian voice actor
 Nanni Balestrini (born 1935), Italian experimental poet, author and visual artist 
 Nanni di Banco (c. 1384–1421), Italian sculptor from Florence
 Nanni Cagnone (born 1939), Italian poet, novelist, essayist and playwright
 Nanni Galli (born 1940), Italian former saloon, sports-car and Formula One driver
 Nanni Loy  (1925–1995), Italian film, theatre and TV director 
 Nanni Moretti (born 1953), Italian film director, producer, screenwriter and actor

Fictional characters
 NANNI, the artificial intelligence daughter of Holly Short and Artemis Fowl II in The Fowl Twins

Italian masculine given names
Italian-language surnames